Longson is a surname. Notable people with the surname include:

Harry Longson (1907–?), South Australian caricaturist
O'Neil Longson, American poker player
Sam Longson (died 1989), British businessman 
Wild Bill Longson, born Willard Rowe Longson (1906–1982), American wrestler